Brusnica Mala is a village in the municipalities of Odžak, Federation of Bosnia and Herzegovina and Brod, Republika Srpska, Bosnia and Herzegovina.

Demographics 
According to the 2013 census, its population was 124, with 102 living in the Odžak part and 22 in the Brod part.

References

Populated places in Odžak
Populated places in Brod, Bosnia and Herzegovina